Calum MacKay may refer to:
 Calum MacKay (ice hockey)
 Calum MacKay (footballer)